Mahesh Bhupathi and Leander Paes were the defending champions but decided not to participate together.
Bhupathi played alongside Rohan Bopanna but were eliminated in the semifinals, while Paes partners up with Janko Tipsarević to win the tournament against Jonathan Erlich and Andy Ram 6–4, 6–4.

Seeds

Draw

Draw

References
 Main Draw

Doubles